Asahiyutaka Katsuteru (born 10 September 1968) is a former sumo wrestler from Kasugai, Aichi, Japan. His highest rank was komusubi. He is now the head coach of Tatsunami stable.

Career
He joined Ōshima stable and made his professional debut in March 1987, and was ranked in the lowest jonokuchi division in the following tournament. However, due to various injury problems he fell off the banzuke ranking sheets and did not actually record his first win in jonokuchi until May 1988. By May 1990 he had progressed to the makushita division and after taking his second makushita yusho or tournament championship in September 1993 he was promoted to the second highest jūryō division. After winning the jūryō yusho in January 1995 he made the top makuuchi division.

Asahiyutaka was ranked in the top division for 24 tournaments, winning two special prizes for Outstanding Performance and Technique. He also earned four kinboshi or gold stars for defeating yokozuna. He reached his highest rank of komusubi in 1996 and held it for three tournaments, but he lacked the weight to regularly beat the top men, and never managed to progress further.

Retirement from sumo
In 1995 he had married the daughter of Osamu Annen, the head coach of the Tatsunami stable, and was legally adopted by him as his son, changing his real name from Taiji Ichikawa to Taiji Annen. This enabled him to take over the running of Tatsunami stable when Annen reached the mandatory retirement age of sixty five in February 1999. Asahiyutaka had in any case lost his top division status at the previous tournament in January, recording only four wins at maegashira 13, and had announced his retirement from active competition.

Asahiyutaka's marriage allowed him to inherit the Tatsunami elder name and stable, but it eventually broke down with the couple being divorced in August 2001. In February 2003 Annen took Asahiyutaka to court, demanding that he be paid for the elder stock that Asahiyutaka had received for free as a result of his marriage. Annen was initially awarded 175 million yen, but Asahiyutaka appealed and the decision was overturned by a higher court in January 2004. Annen did succeed however, in evicting Asahiyutaka from the stable premises.

Asahiyutaka moved Tatsunami stable to a new site, and remarried in 2005. He recruited the Mongolian wrestler Mōkonami who reached the top division in 2009, but Mokonami was forced to retire in 2011 after being found guilty of match-fixing. He voted against the Tatsunami-Isegahama group of stables preferred candidate for the head of the Sumo Association in the 2012 elections, and left the group as a result, aligning his stable with the Takanohana group instead. That group was dissolved by the Sumo Association after high profile scandals involving Takanohana and the stable went independent in 2018, but after the Sumo Association indicated that stables must belong to an ichimon, it aligned itself with the Dewanoumi group.
After several years without any sekitori, Meisei reached the jūryō division in 2016.

Fighting style
Asahiyutaka was a yotsu-sumo wrestler who specialised in grappling rather than pushing techniques. His preferred grip on the opponent's mawashi was hidari-yotsu, a right hand outside, left hand inside position. His favourite kimarite were uwatenage (overarm throw) and katasukashi (under-shoulder swing down).

Career record

See also
Glossary of sumo terms
List of sumo tournament second division champions
List of past sumo wrestlers
List of sumo elders
List of komusubi

References

External links

Complete career results

1968 births
Living people
Japanese sumo wrestlers
People from Kasugai, Aichi
Sumo people from Aichi Prefecture
Komusubi